Mount Oona is a mountain, 2,170 m, at the north end of the ridge between Helm Glacier and Lowery Glacier in the Queen Elizabeth Range. Named by Advisory Committee on Antarctic Names (US-ACAN) for Henn Oona, United States Antarctic Research Program (USARP) aurora scientist at South Pole Station, 1964.

Mountains of the Ross Dependency
Shackleton Coast